Liv Racing TeqFind (UCI code: LIV) is a women's professional cycling team, based in the Netherlands. The title sponsor is Liv, a sub-brand of Taiwanese bicycle manufacturer Giant Bicycles. The team's directeur sportif is Eric van den Boom. Riders for Liv Racing compete in the UCI Women's World Tour and other Elite Women's Cycling events throughout the world.

History of the team

2009

2012

The team's first win of the season came in the Ronde van Drenthe where Marianne Vos claimed victory. The team's first overall General classification win came at the Festival Luxembourgeois du cyclisme féminin Elsy Jacobs, again being won by Vos, along with a stage; Annemiek van Vleuten also won the prologue and a stage. Vos went on to win 5 stages of the 2012 Giro d'Italia Femminile, as well as the General classification. Vos followed this by winning the General classification of the Tour Féminin en Limousin. Vos continued her strong run of wins claiming the 2012 Olympic Games road race in London. The final wins for the team came at the Holland Ladies Tour where Vos won the General classification and took two stage wins. Vos later won the 2012 UCI World Championship road race.

2013
Marianne Vos opened the team's account securing victory in the 2013 UCI Cyclo-cross World Championship. The team's first road win of the season came at the Drentse 8 van Dwingeloo, with Vos claiming victory. Vos went on to win the Ronde van Drenthe and Tour of Flanders. Like the previous season the first overall General classification win came at the Festival Luxembourgeois du cyclisme féminin Elsy Jacobs, with Vos winning the General classification, Points classification and taking a stage win. Like the previous year, Annemiek van Vleuten won the opening prologue. Vos continued her winning streak in one day races taking out wins in the Rabobank 7-Dorpenomloop Aalburg and Durango-Durango Emakumeen Saria. Vos failed to retain her 2013 Giro title, losing to Mara Abbott, but did claim the Points classification and three stages. Vos also claimed overall victory in Trophée d'Or Féminin

2014

The 2014 season marked a different start to the season for the team. Marianne Vos started her road season late, leaving the team to support other riders in the opening races of the year. Lucinda Brand won the team's first General classification of the year at the Energiewacht Tour. Pauline Ferrand-Prévot won the La Flèche Wallonne Féminine with Anna van der Breggen claiming victory at the Dwars door de Westhoek. Van der Breggen then claimed overall victory at the Festival Luxembourgeois du cyclisme féminin Elsy Jacobs with Vos winning the Points classification and Ferrand-Prévot taking both the Mountains and Young rider classifications. Vos then claimed overall victory at the inaugural Women's Tour in Great Britain. The team won further races at the Emakumeen Euskal Bira for Ferrand-Prevot and the 2014 Giro d'Italia Femminile for Vos. Vos followed this up by winning the inaugural La Course by Le Tour de France.

2015
In January the team scored first and third in the UCI World Cyclo-cross championships, with Pauline Ferrand-Prévot and Marianne Vos respectively. This was the year that saw Vos in recovery mode taking most of the year off due to injury. In the first European road race of the season, the Omloop het Nieuwsblad, the team rode very strongly. With  to go, Anna van der Breggen escaped together with Ellen van Dijk from a front group of 15 riders on the Molenberg. The duo extended their advantage over the cobbled sections that followed, holding off the chase group to the line, where van der Breggen won the two-up sprint.

In December 2015 Rabobank announced that it would end its sponsorship of professional sport at the end of 2016, forcing the team to find a new sponsor.

2016
The team replaced , whose sponsorship ceased at the end of 2016.

Marianne Vos led the roster that included Anouska Koster, Katarzyna Niewiadoma, Valentina Scandolara, Yara Kastelijn, Jeanne Korevaar, Moniek Tenniglo, Rotem Gafinovitz, Anna Plichta, Lauren Kitchen and Riejanne Markus.

2017
Marianne Vos started the year riding in Cyclo-Cross competitions winning eight of the twelve races she entered. She won the 2017 Dutch National Cyclo-cross Championships for the sixth time. She placed second at the 2017 UCI Cyclo-cross World Championships in Bieles, Luxembourg on January 28.

In October, the team announced that WaowDeals would join the team as naming-sponsor, with WM3 remaining with the team as a secondary sponsor after agreeing a five-year deal with the team in the winter of 2016.

Team roster

Major wins

National, continental, world and Olympic champions

2006
 World Road Race, Marianne Vos
 World Cyclo-cross, Marianne Vos
 Dutch Road Race, Marianne Vos
 European U23 Road Race, Marianne Vos
2007
 Dutch Track (Points race), Marianne Vos
 Dutch Track (Scratch race), Marianne Vos
 Belgian Road Race, Ludivine Henrion
2008
 Olympic Track (Points race), Marianne Vos
 World Track (Points race), Marianne Vos
 Dutch Road Race, Marianne Vos
 Belgian Time Trial, Liesbet De Vocht
2009
 World Cyclo-cross,  Marianne Vos
 Dutch Road Race, Marianne Vos
2010
 World Cyclo-cross,  Marianne Vos
 Dutch Time Trial, Marianne Vos
 Belgian Road Race, Liesbet De Vocht
 Dutch Road Race, Loes Gunnewijk
2011
 World Cyclo-cross,  Marianne Vos
 Track Cycling World (Scratch race), Marianne Vos
 Dutch Cyclo-cross, Marianne Vos
 Dutch Time Trial, Marianne Vos
 Dutch Road Race, Marianne Vos
2012
 Olympic Road Race, Marianne Vos
 World Road Race, Marianne Vos
 Belgian Time Trial, Liesbet De Vocht
 Dutch Track (Madison), Marianne Vos
 Dutch Track (Madison), Roxane Knetemann

2013
 World Cyclo-cross, Marianne Vos
 Dutch Cyclo-cross, Marianne Vos
 French Time Trial, Pauline Ferrand-Prévot
 Dutch Road Race, Lucinda Brand
 Belgian Road, Liesbet De Vocht
 Swiss U23 XC, Jolanda Neff
 French U23 XC, Pauline Ferrand-Prévot
 Belgian Time Trial, Liesbet De Vocht
 World U23 XC, Jolanda Neff
 World Road Race, Marianne Vos
2014
 French Cyclo-cross, Pauline Ferrand-Prévot
 Dutch Cyclo-cross, Marianne Vos
 World Cyclo-cross, Marianne Vos
 European U23 XC, Pauline Ferrand-Prévot
 Dutch Time Trial, Annemiek van Vleuten
 French Time Trial, Pauline Ferrand-Prévot
 French Road Race, Pauline Ferrand-Prévot
 Dutch Road Race, Iris Slappendel
 European U23 Road Race, Sabrina Stultiens
 French MTB, Pauline Ferrand-Prévot
 World Road Race, Pauline Ferrand-Prévot
 European U23 Cyclo-cross, Sabrina Stultiens
 German Track (Omnium), Anna Knauer
2015
 Australian Time Trial, Shara Gillow
 French Cyclo-cross, Pauline Ferrand-Prévot
 Dutch Cyclo-cross, Marianne Vos
 World Cyclo-cross, Pauline Ferrand-Prévot
 German Track (Points race), Anna Knauer
 Dutch Time Trial, Anna Van der Breggen
 Dutch Road Race, Lucinda Brand
 French Road Race, Pauline Ferrand-Prévot
 European U23 Road Race, Katarzyna Niewiadoma
 French MTB, Pauline Ferrand-Prévot
 World MTB (XCO), Pauline Ferrand-Prévot
 World MTB (Team relay XC), Pauline Ferrand-Prévot
 German Track (Omnium), Anna Knauer
2016
 Dutch Cyclo-cross, Thalita de Jong
 World Cyclo-cross, Thalita de Jong
 Dutch Road Race, Anouska Koster
 Poland Time Trial, Katarzyna Niewiadoma
 Poland Road Race, Katarzyna Niewiadoma
 European Road Race, Anna Van der Breggen
 Olympic Road Race, Anna Van der Breggen
2017
 Dutch Cyclo-cross, Marianne Vos
 European Road Race, Marianne Vos
2019
 South Africa Road Race, Ashleigh Moolman
 Africa Continental Time Trial, Ashleigh Moolman
2020 
 South Africa Time Trial, Ashleigh Moolman 
2021
 Belgian Time Trial, Lotte Kopecky
 Belgian Road Race, Lotte Kopecky
 Canadian Time Trial, Alison Jackson
 Canadian Road Race, Alison Jackson
 World Track (Points race), Lotte Kopecky
 European Mountainbike (Beachrace), Pauliena Rooijakkers
2022
 Czech Road Race, Tereza Neumanova

Team Ranking

Notes

References

External links
 

Cycling teams based in the Netherlands
UCI Women's Teams
Cycling teams established in 2005